Margate Birchington was a ward of Margate Municipal District prior to 1973. When the Municipal District was included in the Thanet District in 1974, Birchington ward elected 5 councillors to the new Borough at the elections of 1973 and 1976.

1973 Election

1976 Election

The election of 1979 was fought on revised boundaries and Birchington ward had been split between Birchington West and Birchington East, each electing two councillors.

Margate